Rogério Hugo Rodrigues dos Santos (born 22 October 1978), commonly known as Formiga, is a Portuguese futsal player who plays as a winger for Gondomar FC. Formiga also played for the Portugal national team, earning 85 caps in total.

References

External links

1978 births
Living people
Sportspeople from Porto
Portuguese men's futsal players
AR Freixieiro players
C.F. Os Belenenses futsal players